Amílton Jesus dos Santos or simply Amílton (born August 13, 1981), is a Brazilian striker playing for Uberlândia Esporte Clube.

Contract
2 May 2007 to 31 December 2008

External links
 atletico.com
 CBF
 futebolinterior
 zerozero.pt
 Guardian Stats Centre

1981 births
Living people
Brazilian footballers
Clube Atlético Mineiro players
Esporte Clube Democrata players
América Futebol Clube (MG) players
Ipatinga Futebol Clube players
Clube de Regatas Brasil players
Uberlândia Esporte Clube players
Association football forwards
People from Jequié
Sportspeople from Bahia